Buarque can be:

Chico Buarque (born 1944) - singer and guitarist
Cristovam Buarque (born 1944 ) - Brazilian politician and university professor
Sérgio Buarque de Holanda (1902–1982) - Brazilian writer
Aurélio Buarque de Holanda Ferreira (1910–1989) - Brazilian writer